Lola Braccini, born Camilla Cariddi  (28 March 1889 - 19 March 1969) was an Italian film, television and stage actress.

Life and career
Born in Pisa, Braccini moved to Rome at 14 years old and debuted on stage in 1912 as an extra at the Teatro Argentina, in a theatrical work directed by Cesare Dondini. After a series of other experiences, in 1917 she entered the company held by Antonio Gandusio, with whom she stayed until 1922, while in 1924 she had her first  leading  roles.  

In 1939 Braccini debuted in a role of "mother" with the company headed by Dina Galli, and in a short time this kind of role became distinctive of her subsequent career, notably gaining critical acclaim for her performance as Christine Mannon in an adaptation of Mourning Becomes Electra directed in  1942 by Anton Giulio Bragaglia. After the war she kept on working on stage with notable directors, including Luchino Visconti, Garinei & Giovannini, Giorgio De Lullo. She was also active in films and on television, and was a voice actress and a dubber. She died in a clinic of Parioli, where she had been hospitalized a week before for heart ailments.

Partial filmography

 My Little One (1933) - Anna, la governante
 To Live (1936)
 No Man's Land (1939) - La signora Securo
 Traversata nera (1939) - Miss Geraldine Grey
 Piccolo hotel (1939) - Rosa Fargas
 Defendant, Stand Up! (1939) - La portinaia
 Mille chilometri al minuto! (1939)
 Le educande di Saint-Cyr (1939) - La direttrice del collegio
 Manon Lescaut (1940) - La direttrice
 Giù il sipario (1940)
 The Hussar Captain (1940) - La seconda zia
 I mariti (Tempesta d'anime) (1941)
 Carmela (1942) - La moglie del sindaco
 Odessa in fiamme (1942) - (uncredited)
 What a Distinguished Family (1945) - Alessandra
 I Met You in Naples (1946)
 Pronto chi parla? (1946)
 Anthony of Padua (1949) - Sua madre
 Bellissima (1951) - Photographer's Wife
 It's Never Too Late (1953) - Madre di Antonio Trabbi
 Cronaca di un delitto (1953) - Madre di Luisa
 Too Young for Love (1953) - Zia di Sergio
 Buon viaggio pover'uomo (1953) - Mamma Caterina
 Verdi, the King of Melody (1953) - (uncredited)
 What Scoundrels Men Are! (1953) - Boarding house owner
 Angels of Darkness (1954) - Signora Capello
 Valeria ragazza poco seria (1958)
 The Beautiful Legs of Sabrina (1958) - The Lady with a Dog
 Winter Holidays (1959) - Mistress of Strange House
 Gastone (1960) - La " signora"
 Le olimpiadi dei mariti (1960)
 The Leopard (1963) - Donna Margherita
 Seduced and Abandoned (1964) - Amalia Califano
 Amori pericolosi (1964) - (segment "La ronda") (final film role)

References

External links

 

1889 births
1969 deaths
People from Pisa
20th-century Italian actresses
Italian film actresses 
Italian stage actresses
Italian voice actresses
Italian television actresses